Epistaurus is a genus of grasshoppers in the family Acrididae, subfamily Coptacrinae.

Species can be found in West and Central Africa, the Indian subcontinent, Indo-China and southern China.

Species
The Orthoptera Species File lists:
Epistaurus aberrans Brunner von Wattenwyl, 1893
Epistaurus bolivari Karny, 1907
Epistaurus crucigerus Bolívar, 1889
Epistaurus diopi Mestre, 2001
Epistaurus meridionalis Bi, 1984
Epistaurus sinetyi Bolívar, 1902
Epistaurus succineus Krauss, 1877

References

External links

Coptacrinae
Acrididae genera
Orthoptera of Indo-China